Francis Male was a rugby league footballer who played in the New South Wales Rugby League(NSWRL). Male played with Eastern Suburbs in the 1916–17 seasons.

References

Australian rugby league players
Sydney Roosters players
Year of birth missing
Year of death missing
Place of birth missing
Rugby league halfbacks